Delort is a surname. Notable people with the surname include: 

Andy Delort (born 1991) Algerian footballer
Charles Édouard Delort (1841–1895), French painter
Jacques-Antoine-Adrien Delort (1773 1846), French general and politician
Pierre-Justin Delort, French priest and academic
Robert Delort (born 1932), French academic